Helicobacter canadensis is a bacterium in the Helicobacteraceae family, Campylobacterales order, first isolated from humans with diarrhea. Its genome has been sequenced.

References

Further reading

External links

LPSN
Type strain of Helicobacter canadensis at BacDive -  the Bacterial Diversity Metadatabase

Campylobacterota
Bacteria described in 2002